Barnsley West and Penistone was a parliamentary constituency in South Yorkshire which returned one Member of Parliament (MP) to the House of Commons of the Parliament of the United Kingdom, elected by the first-past-the-post voting system.

History
It was considered a safe seat for the Labour Party.

Boundaries
The Metropolitan Borough of Barnsley wards of Darton, Dodworth, Hoyland East, Hoyland West, Park, Penistone East, Penistone West, and Worsbrough.

Barnsley West and Penistone constituency was created in 1983 when the former Barnsley constituency was split into three divisions. This seat also contained parts of the former Penistone constituency, which was abolished in the same boundary review: in total it covered the western part of the Borough of Barnsley and included the town of Penistone. It bordered the constituencies of Sheffield Hillsborough, Wentworth, Barnsley East and Mexborough, Barnsley Central, Hemsworth, Wakefield, Colne Valley, and High Peak. Penistone itself provides the highest Conservative vote in the Borough of Barnsley (although not always a majority - see for instance 1998 Barnsley Council election and 2008 Barnsley Council election), but the other small towns and villages, mostly former mining areas, are safely Labour.

Boundary review
Following the Boundary Commission for England's report on South Yorkshire's Parliamentary constituencies in 2004 and the subsequent inquiry in 2005 it was announced that the constituency of Barnsley West and Penistone would be abolished for future elections. The revisions split the constituency in two: the easternmost wards were to become part of a revised Barnsley Central constituency, while the westernmost wards, around Penistone, would be combined with the northern wards from the Sheffield Hillsborough constituency. This new constituency was to be named Penistone and Stocksbridge, and covers a similar area to the historic Penistone constituency.

Members of Parliament
The constituency had two Members of Parliament, both of which were from the Labour Party or Labour Co-operative.

Elections

Elections in the 2000s

Elections in the 1990s

Elections in the 1980s

The first general election in this constituency was won by Allen McKay, who had been the MP for the abolished Penistone constituency since 1978.

See also
List of parliamentary constituencies in South Yorkshire

Notes and references

Sources
BBC Election 2005
BBC Vote 2001
Guardian Unlimited Politics (Election results from 1992 to the present)
Richard Kimber's Political Science Resources (1983 and 1987 results)

Constituencies of the Parliament of the United Kingdom established in 1983
Constituencies of the Parliament of the United Kingdom disestablished in 2010
Politics of Barnsley
Politics of Penistone
Parliamentary constituencies in Yorkshire and the Humber (historic)